Tylenchorhynchus brevilineatus is a plant pathogenic nematode infecting peanut.

References

External links 
 Nemaplex, University of California - Tylenchorhynchus brevilineatus

Agricultural pest nematodes
Tylenchida